Numoni is a Singaporean micro-transaction and application developer. Founded in 2012, the company aims to bring financial inclusion to the underbanked in Southeast Asia. The company develops and manufactures devices that help the underbanked to carry out micro-transactions such
as topping up mobile phone accounts, making little remittances and paying off loans.

History
Numoni was founded in 2012 by Norma Sit, a former Visa International executive. The company is credited with developing and creating Singapore's first micro-transaction terminal. These terminals were aimed specifically at Singapore's large foreign worker population, many of whom are underbanked.

There are currently 80 such terminals across Singapore, allowing members of the public to use cash to top up mobile phone accounts in other parts of Southeast Asia.

Expansion
In order to meet the needs of its customers, Numoni has entered into agreements with various telecommunication companies around the region, including XL Axiata, the Philippines’ Globe and Smart Communications and Bangladesh’s Grameenphone. These collaborations have allowed Numoni to offer the e-wallet service to foreign workers of these countries

References

Electronics companies of Singapore